The Rhume Spring is a large karst spring in the eastern part of the Rotenberg ridge not far from the northeastern edge of the village of Rhumspringe in the Harz mountains of Germany. It is the source of the River Rhume.

Description 
The spring is easily accessible by a nearby road.

External links 

 – private website on the Rhume Spring (German)
Description of the Rhume Spring by the State Office of Mining, Energy and Geology,(pdf, 263 kb)

Springs of Germany
Karst springs
Karst formations of Germany
Landforms of Lower Saxony
Eichsfeld (district)
Osterode (district)
Göttingen (district)
Rhume Spring